Antonis Stathopoulos (born 23 February 1998) is a Greek professional footballer who plays as a striker for Super League 2 club Episkopi.

References

1998 births
Living people
Greek footballers
Greece youth international footballers
Football League (Greece) players
Super League Greece 2 players
Ergotelis F.C. players
Association football forwards
People from Filiatra
Footballers from the Peloponnese